Koloonella micra, common name the minute pyramid-shell,  is a species of sea snail, a marine gastropod mollusk in the family Murchisonellidae, the pyrams and their allies.

Distribution
These marine species occurs off the coast of Tasmania.

References

External links
 To World Register of Marine Species
 Simon Grove: A guide to the seashells and other marine moilluscs of Tasmania : Koloonella micra

Murchisonellidae
Gastropods described in 1884